Dongxiaokou Area is an area and a town located in southern Changping District, Beijing, China. Dongxiaokou borders Shahe and Beiqijia Towns in its north, Tiantongyuanbei and Tiantongyuannan Subdistricts in its east, Dongsheng Town and Huoying Subdistrict in its west, and Shigezhuang Subdistrict in its northwest. As of 2020, its population was 85,874.

History

Administrative divisions 

By the end of 2021, Dongxiaokou Area had direct jurisdiction over 15 subdivisions, in which 5 were communities, and 10 were villages:

See also 

 List of township-level divisions of Beijing

References 

Changping District
Towns in Beijing